Fajer Rabia Pasha (born 1984) is the executive director of Pakistan Alliance for Girls Education She is a social entrepreneur, activist, global leader, and key Influencer fighting for education rights for girls in Pakistan.

Early life 

Pasha was born in Pakistan in 1984. From a young age of 15 she engaged in her mother's charity in Pakistan and helped women entrepreneurs from rural areas connect with global market. She developed a network of support to help these women to showcase their products. She then moved to the United Kingdom with her family in 2000. She registered Inspired Sisters, a social enterprise, at age of 18 in 2003 in Manchester when she identified the need to provide women only facilities for women from ethnic minority backgrounds. She set up a small room with loaned computers to help women access Leardirect, an online training provision. The organisation quickly grew under her leadership. Pasha developed many successful initiatives and partnerships to help women and young people from ethnic minorities acquire education and skills to become job and business ready. Just in the first year, 3000 women received free trainings.

Career 
Due to her extensive work, innovative approach and deep knowledge of challenges faced by women, Fajer's work quickly gained recognition in England. Through Inspired Sisters Fajer set up and lead many initiatives of Education, Entrepreneurship and Employment to help women and marginalized communities out of poverty. Fajer actively served on various Charity board in England and remained engaged at policy level work representing the Civil Society and BAME. Fajer then moved back to Pakistan in 2013 with intention to serve Pakistan and to help bring much needed change. Since then she joined Pakistan Alliance for Girls Education as the Executive Director and raised the organisation from scratch to improve the status of Girls Education in Pakistan through policy, advocacy, mentoring and community lead programs. Fajer is also founding member of Hum Pakistan - working on National Cohesion and Youth Development and actively supports women entrepreneurship.

Recognition 
Fajer's commitment to bring social change through education. Her work for entrepreneurship and social justice has been recognised at many forums including the 2019 Coat of Arms for services to communities in UK & Pakistan. Fajer Rabia for her Inspired Sisters initiative received the award as young Inspiring Women by Lord Mayor of Manchester  2019 Leadership Fellow – Society of Leaders, St George’s House Windsor Castle 2018. She also received recognition Plaque by the Prime Minister of Azad Kashmir and Pakistan 2012 APPS UK Charity Award 2011. She also have been holding following: 
Future 100 Social Entrepreneur Award 2011,
Highly Commended National Young Director Award 2010, 
Northwest Young Inspiring Women Award 2010, 
Manchester Young Director Award 2010, and
Northwest Young Director Award

References 
 #https://gulfnews.com/world/asia/pakistan/pakistan-islamic-council-to-help-improve-girls-education-1.73565286
               #https://www.rewired2021.com/speaker2/fajer-rabia-pasha/

1984 births
Living people
Pakistani academic administrators
Social entrepreneurs
Pakistani women
Pakistani emigrants to the United Kingdom